Fang is a district (amphoe) in the northern part of Chiang Mai province, northern Thailand.

History
According to the Yonok chronicle, Mueang Fang was built in 641 by King Lawa Changkarat. Later, King Mengrai the Great ruled over Fang before building Wiang Kumkam and Chiang Mai as successive capitals of the Lanna Kingdom, beginning in 1294. Prior to the new capitals, Mengrai had used Mueang Fang as a base to invade Hariphunchai.

In 1910, Mueang Fang was made part of Chiang Rai province, and named Mueang Fang District. In 1925 it was reassigned to Chiang Mai Province. In 1938 the word mueang was dropped from the name, which was then reserved for capital districts of the provinces.

Etymology
The landscape of Mueang Fang looked like the seed of a fang tree (Caesalpinia sappan). The town was named after this tree.

Geography

Neighboring districts are (from the northeast, clockwise) Mae Ai of Chiang Mai Province, Mae Suai of Chiang Rai province, Chai Prakan of Chiang Mai Province, and Shan State of Myanmar.  The Fang River, a tributary of the Kok River, gives its name to the district.

Doi Pha Hom Pok National Park is in Fang District. The Daen Lao Range runs through the district's north and west, and the Khun Tan Range begins in the south of the district.

Administration
The district is divided into eight subdistricts (tambons), which are further subdivided into 128 villages (mubans). There are two townships (thesaban tambons): Wiang Fang covers parts of tambon Wiang, and Ban Mae Kha parts of tambon Mae Kha. There are a further eight tambon administrative organizations (TAO).

Missing numbers are tambons which now form Chai Prakan district.

See also 
 Fangchanupathum School

References

External links

 amphoe.com (Thai) 
 Doi Phahompok National Park

Fang